The Canterbury women's field hockey team are an amateur sports team based in New Zealand. The team competes annually in the Ford National Hockey League (NHL).

History
In total, Canterbury have won the Women's NHL a total of 3 times.

Canterbury are the most recent champions, having defeated North Harbour 3–2 in the final of the 2016 Tournament.

Team Roster
The following is the Canterbury team roster for the 2017 Ford NHL:

Head coaches: Sue & Andy Innes

Jessie Anderson
Margot Willis
Libby Bird
Jordy Grant
Sophie Cocks
Georgie Mackay-Stewart
Jenny Storey (C)
Pippa Hayward
Rachel McCann
Leah butt
Emily Wium
Charlotte Symes
Kirsty Nation (GK)
Iona Young (GK)
Bridget Kiddle
Sian Fremaux
Millie Calder
Sarah Rutherford

References

Women's field hockey teams in New Zealand
2000 establishments in New Zealand